Interstate 29 (I-29) is an Interstate Highway in the Midwestern United States. I-29 runs from Kansas City, Missouri, at a junction with I-35 and I-70, to the Canada–US border near Pembina, North Dakota, where it connects with Manitoba Provincial Trunk Highway 75 (PTH 75), which continues on to Winnipeg. The road follows the course of three major rivers, all of which form the borders of US states. The southern portion of I-29 closely parallels the Missouri River from Kansas City northward to Sioux City, Iowa, where it crosses and then parallels the Big Sioux River. For the northern third of the highway, it closely follows the Red River of the North. The major cities that I-29 connects to includes (from south to north) Council Bluffs, Iowa; Sioux Falls, South Dakota; and Fargo, North Dakota.

Route description

|-align=right
|align=center|MO
|128.71
|207.14
|-align=right
|align=center|IA
|151.83
|244.35
|-align=right
|align=center|SD
|252.50
|406.36
|-align=right
|align=center|ND
|217.54
|350.10
|-align=right
|align=center|Total
|750.58
|1,207.94
|}

Missouri

Near its southern terminus, I-29 is concurrent with I-35 and U.S. Route 71 (US 71). The Interstate diverts from US 71 just north of St. Joseph and follows a sparsely populated corridor along the Missouri River to Council Bluffs. During the design phase there was an alternative sending the route further along US 71 through the bigger towns of Maryville, Missouri, and Clarinda, Iowa. During the Great Flood of 1993, the Missouri River flooded this section and traffic was rerouted to US 71 through Maryville and Clarinda. I-29 was closed again for about two months during the 2011 Missouri River Flood.

Almost all of I-29 in Missouri is in an area called the Platte Purchase that was not originally part of Missouri when it entered the Union.

Iowa

I-29 begins in Iowa near Hamburg. It goes northwest to an interchange with Iowa Highway 2 (Iowa 2), then goes north until Council Bluffs. North of Council Bluffs, I-29 intersects I-680 at exit 61. At exit 71, I-880 begins, while I-29 continues on a northwesterly path toward Sioux City. At Sioux City, I-129 spurs off of I-29 to go west toward South Sioux City, Nebraska. After continuing toward downtown Sioux City on a northerly route, I-29 turns west and enters South Dakota.

South Dakota

I-29 enters South Dakota at North Sioux City by crossing over the Big Sioux River. It runs northwest until its interchange with Highway 50 (SD 50) near Vermillion, where it turns north. The highway alignment is due north until just before Sioux Falls. In the Sioux Falls area, I-29 serves the western part of Sioux Falls while I-229 spurs off and serves eastern Sioux Falls. In northwestern Sioux Falls, I-29 meets I-90. After that, it continues north past Brookings and an intersection with US 14. At the intersection with SD 28, I-29 turns northwest toward Watertown. After Watertown, the highway continues north and passes an intersection with US 12 before continuing into North Dakota.

North Dakota

I-29 enters North Dakota from the south near Hankinson. At Fargo, it meets I-94/US 52 and continues north along the Red River toward Grand Forks. At its northern terminus, I-29 enters Canada and becomes PTH 75 in Manitoba, which leads to Winnipeg.

History

Interstate 31
The portion from Fargo, North Dakota, to the Canada–US border was originally considered for designation as Interstate 31 (I-31) in 1957 for present-day I-29. No freeway was initially planned south of Fargo. However, it was subsequently decided in 1958 to connect I-29 and I-31 between Sioux Falls and Fargo. The entire freeway was then built and numbered as I-29.

Interstate 49

Residents of Missouri, Arkansas, and Louisiana began campaigning in the 1960s to extend I-29 via the US 71 corridor from Kansas City, Missouri, to New Orleans, Louisiana. The campaign would create a limited access highway from New Orleans to Canada and on to Winnipeg. That extension came to be called I-49, which was not part of the 1957 master plan. It was assigned a separate number instead of I-29 to conform with the numbering rules for Interstate Highways (increasing from west to east for north–south routes), as it would lie east of I-35 and west of I-55. When I-49 is complete, the goal of the association will have been accomplished, with only a brief gap (served by other Interstates or US 71) and name change in Kansas City, Missouri.

2019 closures 

Much of this section of I-29, including at the Missouri–Iowa border, runs over or through a large floodplain for the Missouri and Platte rivers. As such, multiple elevated sections of the highway collapsed and other sections were submerged or washed out by floodwaters. This was the largest closure of an Interstate Highway in terms of distance in the history of the Interstate Highway System. A signed detour was not officially designated in most areas, as the roads that would be used as detours are mostly rural farm roads that were also submerged by flooding. However, along I-80 in Iowa, traffic from I-80 in Iowa was officially detoured via I-35 from Des Moines, Iowa, to Kansas City, Missouri. US 75, paralleling I-29 on the other side of the Missouri River, was also closed in large sections due to flooding.

By May 2019, the vast majority of I-29 had been repaired and reopened, with the exception of  around Council Bluffs where the highway ran concurrent with I-680 (now the portion of I-29 between I-680 and I-880). However, throughout the remainder of the spring and summer, and even early fall, more rainfall and flooding resulted in sections of I-29 being closed again, including on the recently repaired sections. At a few times, the entire  section between St. Joseph and Council Bluffs was completely shut down, although this was rare after May 2019.

As of October 2019, all of I-29 is open to traffic in both directions, although some Missouri River bridges and local farm roads remain closed due to flooding.

Junction list
Missouri
  at the Downtown Loop in Kansas City. I-29 / I-35 travel concurrently through Kansas City. I-29 / US 71 travel concurrently to east of Amazonia.
  on the Gladstone–Kansas City city line
  on the Gladstone–Kansas City city line
  in Kansas City
  in Kansas City. The highways travel concurrently to Platte City.
  south-southeast of St. Joseph
  in St. Joseph
  in St. Joseph
  in St. Joseph
  north-northeast of St. Joseph. The highways travel concurrently to east of Amazonia.
  north of St. Joseph
  northwest of Amazonia.
  north of Oregon
  south-southeast of Mound City
  east of Craig
  in Rock Port
Iowa
  west of Glenwood. I-29 / US 275 travel concurrently to Council Bluffs.
  in Council Bluffs.
  in Council Bluffs
  west-southwest of Crescent 
 west-southwest of Loveland
  in Missouri Valley
  in Sioux City
  in Sioux City
South Dakota
  south-southwest of Worthing.
  in Sioux Falls
  in Sioux Falls
  in Brookings
  in Watertown
  northeast of Watertown. The highways travel concurrently to east of Manvel, North Dakota.
  northwest of Summit
North Dakota
  in Fargo
  in Fargo
  in Grand Forks
  south-southwest of Joliette. The highways travel concurrently to the Canada–United States border north of Pembina.
  at the Canada–United States border north of Pembina

Auxiliary routes
St. Joseph, Missouri: I-229
Sioux City, Iowa: I-129
Sioux Falls, South Dakota: I-229

See also

 Business routes of Interstate 29

References

External links

 
Interstate Highway System